is the title of Toei Company's thirty-third entry in its long-running Super Sentai metaseries of Japanese tokusatsu television series. It aired from February 15, 2009 to February 7, 2010, replacing Engine Sentai Go-onger and was replaced by Tensou Sentai Goseiger. It joined Kamen Rider Decade as a program featured in TV Asahi's Super Hero Time programming block, and following Decades finale, it aired alongside Kamen Rider W. It incorporates elements from the Jidaigeki drama genre and Japanese themes and aesthetics.

Its footage and storyline was used for the American series Power Rangers Samurai and its follow up season, Super Samurai.

Story

For eighteen generations, samurai of the  have suppressed the evil intentions of the Gedoushu, malevolent spirits that enter the world of the living from gaps between buildings and other structures. Now, Takeru Shiba, the youngest head of the Shiba Clan must gather his four  in order to battle the Gedoushu under the revived Doukoku Chimatsuri as the Shinkengers. However, as they are joined by his childhood friend Genta, the vassals slowly learn that there's a reason for Takeru's behavior that sets him apart from his predecessors.

Episodes

Episodes of Kamen Rider Decade on July 12 and July 19, 2009, as well as Shinkenger Act 21, featured a crossover between the two series.

Production
The trademark for the series was filed by Toei Company on August 12, 2008.

Films

The Fateful War

The film  opened in Japanese theaters on August 8, 2009, double-billed with the Kamen Rider Decade film. Unlike previous films, it was filmed in 3-D, and is the first film in Japan to be filmed digitally in 3-D. A normal 2-D version is being shown in most theaters in Japan. The events of the movie take place between Acts 24 and 25.

Shinkenger vs. Go-onger

The film  was released in theaters on January 30, 2010, featuring a crossover between the Shinkenger and Go-onger casts and characters. The heroes of Tensou Sentai Goseiger make a cameo appearance in the film. The events of the movie take place between Acts 35 and 36.

Goseiger vs. Shinkenger

The film  was released in theaters on January 22, 2011, featuring a crossover between the Goseiger and Shinkenger casts and characters. The heroes of Kaizoku Sentai Gokaiger make a cameo appearance in the film.

Kyuranger vs. Space Squad

 is a V-Cinema release that features a crossover between Uchu Sentai Kyuranger and Space Squad. Aside from the main cast of Kyuranger, Yuma Ishigaki and Hiroaki Iwanaga (Space Sheriff Gavan: The Movie), Yuka Hirata (Juken Sentai Gekiranger), Mitsuru Karahashi (Samurai Sentai Shinkenger), Kei Hosogai (Kaizoku Sentai Gokaiger) and Ayame Misaki (Tokumei Sentai Go-Busters) return to reprise their respective roles. The V-Cinema was released on DVD and Blu-ray on August 8, 2018.

Special DVD
 is a special DVD that is used to show some of the items in the series. The events of the specials take place between Acts 35 and 36.

Genta finds a starved member of the Nanashi Company who tells Genta that he has run away from the Rokumon Junk after being sick of his company being abused by the stronger Gedoushu. Feeling sorry for him, Genta takes him back to the Shiba House and tries to get him a job. After Takeru refuses to help due to the fact that he is a member of the Gedoushu, Genta attempts to prove Takeru wrong about the Nanashi with the help of the kuroko. However, after nearly burning to death, the Nanashi feels that he is a lost cause, believing he is doomed to fail. Genta encourages him not to give up. The next day, Takeru discovers that the Inromaru and the Super Disk are gone along with the Nanashi. Remembering the Nanashi's love for chirashizushi, Genta lures him out with it and is shocked that the Nanashi has stolen the Inromaru.

While telling Genta another sob story, the Nanashi sucker punches him before using the Inromaru to turn into Super Nanashi. Super Nanashi reveals that he has used Genta to steal the Inromaru, and he adds on that he never liked Genta's sushi. Enraged, Genta transforms into Shinken Gold and with Shinken Red fights the Super Nanashi. The two are no match for Super Nanashi until Shinken Gold uses the Kyoryu Disk to become Hyper Shinken Gold. With his newfound power, he and Shinken Red are able to slay Super Nanashi and retrieve the Inromaru. After the fight, Genta is still disappointed that he believed Super Nanashi along with the company member insulting sushi. Takeru cheers him up by requesting a piece of sushi and enjoying it, raising Genta's spirits.

V-Cinema

In June 2010, the V-Cinema release  was released. The Shinkengers are attacked by a remnant Gedoushu Ayakashi who traps them in various film genres. The events of the movie take place between Acts 43 and 44.

Cast
:  the first shinken red
: 
: 
: 
: 
: 
: 
:  the second shinken red
: 
: 
: 
: 
In episodes 25 and 40, Romi Park appeared on screen as Usuyuki, Dayu's original human form.
: 
: 
: 
Narration, Sushi Changer Voice, Inromaru Voice:

Guest cast

Takeru's father (1, 12, 33, 46): 
: 
: 
: 
: 
: 
: 
: 
: 
: 
:

Songs
Opening theme
 
 Lyrics: Shoko Fujibayashi
 Composition: YOFFY
 Arrangement: Project.R (Kenichiro Ōishi & Psychic Lover)
 Artist: Psychic Lover (Project.R)
Ending theme
 
 Lyrics: Shoko Fujibayashi
 Composition: Hideaki Takatori
 Arrangement: Project.R (Hiroaki Kagoshima)
 Artist: Hideaki Takatori (Project.R)
 Instruments: 
 Episodes: 1-20, 29-48
 
 Lyrics: Shoko Fujibayashi
 Composition: Hideaki Takatori
 Arrangement: Project.R (Hiroaki Kagoshima)
 Artist: Shinkengers (Tori Matsuzaka, Hiroki Aiba, Rin Takanashi, Shogo Suzuki, Suzuka Morita, Keisuke Sohma) & Hideaki Takatori
 Episodes: 21-28

The opening and ending themes of Shinkenger are performed by Psychic Lover and Hideaki Takatori as part of Project.R, respectively. The opening is also featured as a playable song in Taiko no Tatsujin Wii: Do Don to 2 Daime.

Its opening theme song single ranked highly on the Oricon charts, reaching #4 on the Daily Ranking Charts on its day of release. and peaked at #6 on the weekly charts selling 20,130 copies within its first week of release and stayed in the top 30 ranks for 4 weeks straight.

References

External links

 at Toei Company
 at Super-Sentai.net
 at Nippon Columbia
 at Bandai

2009 Japanese television series debuts
2010 Japanese television series endings
2010s Japanese television series
Fiction about origami
Fictional samurai
Martial arts television series
Super Sentai
Television shows written by Yasuko Kobayashi